The Roots of Heaven may refer to:
 The Roots of Heaven (film), a 1958 American adventure film
 The Roots of Heaven (novel), a 1956 Romain Gary novel